The gigue or giga is a lively baroque dance originating from the English jig. It was imported into France in the mid-17th century and usually appears at the end of a suite. The gigue was probably never a court dance, but it was danced by nobility on social occasions and several court composers wrote gigues.

Gigues often have a contrapuntal texture as well as often having accents on the third beats in the bar, making the gigue a lively folk dance.

In early French theatre, it was customary to end a play's performance with a gigue, complete with music and dancing.

A gigue, like other Baroque dances, consists of two sections.

Etymology
An early Italian dance called the giga probably derives its name from a small accompanying stringed instrument called the giga. Historians, such as Charles Read Baskerville, claim that use of the word in relation to dancing took place in England prior to such usage on the Continent. Giga probably has a separate etymology.

Cultural references
Jonathan Littell's novel The Kindly Ones is structured in different parts, each one of these named after a Baroque dance, the last part being called Gigue.

See also
 Jig (folk dance)
 Loure (slow gigue)

References

Further reading
 Simone Voyer, La Gigue, Québec: GID, 2003  

Baroque dance
European dances
Baroque music
Dance forms in classical music